Gracias a Dios (English: Thanks to God) may refer to:

Gracias a Dios Department, a department of Honduras
Cabo Gracias a Dios, a cape in Honduras
"Gracias a Dios" (song), a song by Mexican singer Thalía